Royal Trust may refer to:

 Royal Trust (Belgium)
 Royal Trust (Canada), a trust company founded in 1899 in Montreal and part of Royal Bank of Canada since 1993
 Royal Collection Trust, a British charitable body established in 1993
 The Princess Royal Trust for Carers (UK)

See also 
 Royal Bank (disambiguation)